Baadshaho is a 2017 Indian Hindi-language action-adventure film written by Rajat Arora and directed by Milan Luthria. It stars Ajay Devgn, Emraan Hashmi, Ileana D'Cruz, Vidyut Jammwal, Esha Gupta and Sanjay Mishra. The film is set in the emergency era of 1975–77.

Plot
In 1973, Maharani Gitanjali is a princess to a royal family in Rajasthan. Although every royal family was required to turn over their wealth at the end of the ancestral reign, her ancestors did not hand it over to the government. Two years later, in 1975, the then Prime Minister of India, Indira Gandhi, declares a state of emergency in the country. Sanjeev, an influential person in the Congress government, plots revenge against Gitanjali after he was snubbed badly by her in 1973. Sanjeev asks army officer Colonel Rudra Pratap Singh to confiscate all the gold in Gitanjali's possession and to put her behind bars. Rudra follows Sanjeev's instructions and imprisons Gitanjali after forcibly taking possession of her gold.
 
Rudra asks his trusted lieutenants, Major Seher Singh and Captain Somesh, to transfer all the gold to Delhi into the government's safekeeping. For this purpose, he gives Seher Singh a custom-made truck with a powerful safe to transport the confiscated gold. As Rudra and Seher Singh are discussing, Sanjana, Gitanjali's trusted aide, is sent by her to eavesdrop on their conversation and get a whiff of their plan. Gitanjali then plans an entire scheme; she wants Sanjana to accompany Bhawani Singh in getting all the gold back and eventually release her from jail.
 
Gitanjali briefs Bhawani Singh, her trusted lieutenant, about the gold and her reasons for keeping it - she needs the money to look after the people in her village. The loyal Bhawani Singh promises to retrieve the gold and return it to Gitanjali, with whom he shares a romantic relationship.
 
Bhawani Singh, along with Daliya, Guruji, and Sanjana, chalk out their plan and set out on the mission. The four follow the truck in which Seher Singh and his deputy, Somesh, are carrying the gold to Delhi. The group takes control of the truck after throwing out Seher Singh and Somesh. The job now is to open the strong safe, something at which Guruji is adept. Meanwhile, Seher Singh, boss Rudra Pratap Singh, and other army and police officers are hot on the trail of Bhawani Singh and the truck. At one point, the army officers seek the help of police officer Durjan, but Bhawani Singh and his team members outwit him.
 
Before Bhawani Singh can return the gold to Gitanjali Devi, he learns that Gitanjali used him for her personal happiness and motives, and that Seher was her aide. Bhawani reveals that he already knew the dark truth about Gitanjali, and his team decided to distribute gold among poor people who suffered from Gitanjali's wrath. After the war between Seher and Bhawani's team ends, Gitanjali realizes that she is alone in the desert with a low chance of survival, while Bhawani and his team escape.

Cast
Ajay Devgn as Bhavani Singh
Emraan Hashmi as Dalia
Ileana D'Cruz as Rani Gitanjali Devi (a character based on Gayatri Devi)
Esha Gupta as Sanjana Rao
Vidyut Jammwal as Army Officer Major Seher Singh
Sanjay Mishra as Tikla aka Guruji
Priyanshu Chatterjee as Sanjay Kumar Mishra (politician) (a character based on Sanjay Gandhi)
Sharad Kelkar as Police Inspector Durjan
Lankesh Bhardwaj as Supdt. Meena
Adil Hussain as Officer
Denzil Smith as Colonel Rudra Pratap Singh
Ravi Kale as Babu Moshai
Sunny Leone as special appearance in a song ("Piya More")
Aishmita Meena as Village Lady

Production

Development
In January 2015, Ajay Devgn signed Milan Luthria's Baadshaho, marking his fourth collaboration with the director after Kachche Dhaage (1999), Chori Chori (2003) and Once Upon a Time in Mumbaai (2010). This was the third collaboration of Emraan Hashmi with the director after Once Upon A Time in Mumbaai and The Dirty Picture (2012). Luthria stated that besides directing he was also co-producing the film along with Bhushan Kumar's T-Series. Ankit Tiwari was music director.

Casting

Actresses Aishwarya Rai, Kareena Kapoor, Katrina Kaif, Shruti Hassan and Priyanka Chopra were speculated as the lead actress opposite Ajay Devgn. Though Kareena Kapoor and Katrina Kaif liked the script, they declined the offer due to non-availability. The film was to star Diljit Dosanjh initially, though he opted out of the project subsequently and was replaced by Emraan Hashmi.

Later in June 2016, actors Vidyut Jammwal, Ileana D'Cruz and Esha Gupta were officially confirmed to be in the cast. Priyanshu Chatterjee was cast in a special appearance for the role of the politician Sanjeev, modelled after Sanjay Gandhi.

Filming
Principal photography commenced on 15 August 2016 in Mumbai. The second schedule started on 1 December 2016 in Jodhpur, Rajasthan. The third schedule commenced on 19 January 2017.
 
Ileana D'Cruz wrapped her part of filming on 5 March 2017. The Rajasthan schedule was wrapped up on 9 March 2017.

Release and marketing 
The makers of the film earlier announced that the films worldwide release would be on 22 December 2016. However, upon request from producers Ritesh Sidhwani and Rakesh Roshan of the films Raees and Kaabil respectively, Bhushan Kumar moved the worldwide release date to 12 May 2017. In early December 2016, Devgn announced 1 September 2017 as the worldwide release date.

Soundtrack

The soundtrack was released on 19 August 2017 by T-Series, which consists of eight songs, composed by Tanishk Bagchi, Ankit Tiwari, Abhijit Vaghani, DJ Chetas and Traditional Folk. The songs "Mere Rashke Qamar" and "Socha Hai" ("Kehdoon Tumhe" from the 1975 film Deewaar) are recreations for the film by lyricist Manoj Muntashir and composer Tanishk Bagchi. Their originals were written by Fana Buland Shehri and Sahir Ludhianvi, and were composed by Nusrat Fateh Ali Khan and R. D. Burman respectively.

The song "Piya More" (first version) is a remake from Ankit Tiwari's old tune "Nasha Shar Pe Chadke Bhole" (from the film "Dee Saturday Night"). Then, Tiwari changed the tune and some lyrics cause the controversy. This song appearance Sunny Leone and Emraan Hashmi. Sung by Neeti Mohan and Mika Singh.

The song "Socha Hai" was later changed to the lyrics due to copyright issues. The song changed without "Socha Hai", "Kehdoon Tumhe". Sung by Jubin Nautiyal and Neeti Mohan without Kishore Kumar and Asha Bhoshle's additional vocals. You can listen the new version of Socha Hai in Jubin's Compilation Album: "Best Of Jubin Nautiyal" (2016) & "Best Of Jubin Nautiyal" (2020). But, the song is not available on some online music player like Spotify, Gaana and JioSaavn.

T-Series later private the official video of the song "Socha Hai" and Jukebox audio video of the film.

Accolades

References

External links

T-Series (company) films
2010s Hindi-language films
2017 films
Indian action adventure films
Indian heist films
Indian action thriller films
Indian historical action films
Films set in the 1970s
Films set in Rajasthan
Films shot in Rajasthan
Indian films based on actual events
Works about the Emergency (India)
2010s heist films
2017 action thriller films
2010s action adventure films
Films directed by Milan Luthria